These Days is the eleventh studio album and the first box set by American country music artist Vince Gill. Consisting of 43 original songs spanning four discs, the album displays the range of Gill’s lyrical and musical styles, ranging from traditional country and bluegrass to jazz and rock. The album was nominated for two Grammy Awards including Album of the Year and won Best Country Album. In 2012, the album was number 10 on People Magazine's "Top 10 Best Albums of the Century (So Far)". It is also ranked #9 on Country Universe's "The 100 Greatest Albums of the Decade."

History
To accompany him on this undertaking, Gill turned both to artists he knew and had worked with before and to those whose music he admired from
a distance. "I never try to fill up my records with famous people," Gill says. "I try to fill them up with the most talented people I can find on the face of the earth." By the time the project was completed, that group included Sheryl Crow, Bonnie Raitt, Diana Krall, Rodney Crowell, Patty Loveless, Phil Everly, the Del McCoury Band, Alison Krauss, Emmylou Harris, John Anderson, Lee Ann Womack, Jenny Gill, Amy Grant, LeAnn Rimes, Gretchen Wilson, Guy Clark, Trisha Yearwood, Bekka Bramlett, Michael McDonald, steel-guitarist Buddy Emmons and many other musical standouts.

Initially, Gill planned to pare down the songs to a single album. Then, in one of the studios he used, he spotted some Beatles memorabilia and recalled that the Fab Four had routinely released multiple albums within the same year.

The album debuted on the U.S. Billboard 200 at number 17, with 42,000 copies sold in its first week. This was also the album's peak position on the chart.

Singles
Three singles were released from this album, of which two were duets. The first single, "The Reason Why" (featuring Alison Krauss) reached #28 on the Hot Country Songs charts; following it was "What You Give Away", which featured Sheryl Crow and peaked at #43. The third single, "How Lonely Looks", failed to chart.

Track listing

Workin' on a Big Chill
"The Rockin' Record"

"Workin’ on a Big Chill" (Gill, Al Anderson, Leslie Satcher) - 4:03
"Love’s Standin’" (Gill, Joe Henry, John Hobbs) - 4:05
"Cowboy Up" (featuring Gretchen Wilson) (Gill, Pete Wasner) - 4:00
"Sweet Thing" (Gill, Gary Nicholson) - 3:20
"Bet It All on You" (Gill, Anderson) - 4:26
"Nothin’ for a Broken Heart" (Duet w/Rodney Crowell) (Gill, Anderson) - 3:03
"Son of a Ramblin’ Man" (featuring Del McCoury Band) (Gill, Anderson) - 2:45
"Smilin’ Song" (featuring Michael McDonald) (Gill) - 2:59 
"The Rhythm of the Pourin’ Rain" (featuring Bekka Bramlett) (Gill, Wasner) - 3:26
"Nothin’ Left to Say" (Gill, Billy Thomas) - 3:56

The Reason Why
"The Groovy Record"

"What You Don't Say" (with LeAnn Rimes) (Gill, Hobbs, Reed Nielsen) - 5:03
"The Reason Why" (with Alison Krauss) (Gill, Nicholson) - 2:50
"The Rock of Your Love" (with Bonnie Raitt) (Gill, Anderson, Satcher) - 3:51
"What You Give Away" (with Sheryl Crow) (Gill, Anderson) - 4:52
"Faint of Heart" (with Diana Krall) (Gill, Anderson) - 4:30
"Time to Carry On" (with Jenny Gill) (Gill, Wasner) - 4:09
"No Easy Way" (Gill, Nielsen) - 3:40
"This Memory of You" (with Trisha Yearwood) (Gill, Anderson, Hobbs) - 3:43
"How Lonely Looks" (Gill, Beverly W. Darnell) - 5:10
"Tell Me One More Time About Jesus" (with Amy Grant) (Gill, Grant) - 4:02
"Everything and Nothing" (with Katrina Elam) (Gill, Darnell, Kyle D. Matthews) - 4:02
"Which Way Will You Go" (Gill, Hobbs, Nielsen) - 4:11
"These Days" (Gill) - 3:55

Some Things Never Get Old
"The Country and Western Record"

"This New Heartache" (Gill)  - 3:31
"The Only Love" (Gill, Nielsen) - 3:53
"Out of My Mind" (featuring Patty Loveless) (Gill, Anderson, Satcher) - 3:18
"The Sight of Me Without You" (Gill, Anderson, Hobbs) - 4:07
"I Can’t Let Go" (featuring Alison Krauss & Dan Tyminski) (Gill) - 3:28
"Don’t Pretend with Me" (Gill, Anderson, Satcher) - 2:32
"Some Things Never Get Old" (featuring Emmylou Harris) (Gill, Anderson, Tia Sillers) - 4:11
"Sweet Little Corrina" (featuring Phil Everly) (Gill, Anderson) - 2:52
"If I Can Make Mississippi" (featuring Lee Ann Womack) (Gill) - 3:44
"Take This Country Back" (Duet w/John Anderson) (Gill) - 3:37

Little Brother
"The Acoustic Record"

"All Prayed Up" (Gill) - 2:16
"Cold Gray Light of Gone" (featuring The Del McCoury Band) (Gill, Bill Anderson, Otto Kitsinger) - 4:03
"A River Like You" (featuring Jenny Gill) (Gill, Randy Albright, Mark D. Sanders) - 4:50
"Ace Up Your Pretty Sleeve" (Gill, Mark Germino) - 3:33
"Molly Brown" (Gill, Jim Waggoner) - 4:19
"Girl" (Guest Vocalist: Rebecca Lynn Howard) (Gill) - 4:30
"Give Me the Highway" (featuring The Del McCoury Band) (Gill) - 3:14
"Sweet Augusta Darlin’" (Gill) - 3:12
"Little Brother" (Gill) - 4:46
"Almost Home" (Duet w/Guy Clark) (Gill) - 5:19

Personnel

 John Anderson – duet vocals on "Take This Country Back"
 Eddie Bayers – drums
 Bekka Bramlett – background vocals on "The Rhythm of the Pourin' Rain"
 Tom Britt – acoustic guitar, electric guitar, gut string guitar, slide guitar
 Mike Bub – upright bass
 Tom Bukovac – electric guitar
 Guy Clark – duet vocals on "Almost Home"
 Lisa Cochran – background vocals
 Jim Cox – Hammond B-3 organ
 Chad Cromwell – drums, tambourine
 Sheryl Crow – duet vocals on "What You Give Away"
 Rodney Crowell – duet vocals on "Nothin' for a Broken Heart"
 Charlie Cushman – banjo
 Eric Darken – bells, chimes, percussion, tambourine, vibraphone
 Jerry Douglas – Dobro
 Mark Douthit – tenor saxophone
 Stuart Duncan – fiddle
 Katrina Elam – duet vocals on "Everything and Nothing"
 Buddy Emmons – steel guitar
 Phil Everly – duet vocals on "Sweet Little Corrina"
 Paul Franklin – Dobro, steel guitar
 Benny Garcia – choir
 Jenny Gill – background vocals on "Time to Carry On" and "A River Like You"
 Vince Gill – choir, 12-string guitar, acoustic guitar, electric guitar, resonator guitar, guitar sound effects, mandolin, soloist, lead vocals, background vocals
 Carl Gorodetzky – concert master
 Amy Grant – duet vocals on "Tell Me One More Time About Jesus"
 Barry Green – trombone
 Emmylou Harris – duet vocals on "Some Things Never Get Old"
 Mike Haynes – trumpet
 Wes Hightower – background vocals
 John Hobbs – choir, Fender Rhodes, Hammond B-3 organ, piano, Wurlitzer
 Jim Hoke – harmonica
 Jim Horn – baritone saxophone, horn arrangements
 Rebecca Lynn Howard – duet vocals on "Girl"
 John Hughey – steel guitar
 Sonya Isaacs – background vocals
 Kim Keyes – background vocals
 Diana Krall – piano and duet vocals on "Faint of Heart"
 Alison Krauss – background vocals on "The Reason Why" and "I Can't Let Go"
 Patty Loveless – background vocals on "Out of My Mind"
 Del McCoury – acoustic guitar and background vocals on "Son of a Ramblin' Man", "Cold Gray Light of Gone", and "Give Me the Highway"
 Rob McCoury – banjo on "Son of a Ramblin' Man", "Cold Gray Light of Gone", and "Give Me the Highway"
 Ronnie McCoury – mandolin on "Son of a Ramblin' Man", "Cold Gray Light of Gone", and Give Me the Highway"
 Michael McDonald – duet vocals on "Smilin' Song"
 Gene Miller – background vocals
 Doug Moffet – baritone saxophone
 The Nashville String Machine – strings
 Justin Niebank – choir
 Calvin Nowell – choir
 Michael Omartian – horn arrangements
 Williams Owsley III – background vocals
 Desmond Pringle – choir
 Bonnie Raitt – duet vocals on "The Rock of Your Love"
 Jon Randall – background vocals
 Drea Rhenee – choir
 Michael Rhodes – bass guitar, upright bass
 LeAnn Rimes – duet vocals on "What You Don't Say"
 Leslie Satcher – background vocals
 Dawn Sears – background vocals
 Steuart Smith – electric guitar
 Billy Thomas – drums, background vocals
 Dan Tyminski – background vocals on "I Can't Let Go"
 Billy Joe Walker Jr. – electric guitar
 Pete Wasner – Hammond B-3 organ, piano, electric piano, synthesizer, Wurlitzer
 Jeff White – acoustic guitar, background vocals
 Gretchen Wilson – duet vocals on "Cowboy Up"
 Lee Ann Womack – background vocals on "If I Can Make Mississippi"
 Trisha Yearwood – duet vocals on "This Memory of You"
 Andrea Zonn – background vocals

Chart performance

Weekly charts

Year-end charts

References

External links
 

Vince Gill albums
MCA Records albums
2006 albums
Grammy Award for Best Country Album